Roberto Bonet Cáceres (born 17 noviembre 1980 in Asunción) is a Paraguayan football midfielder. He currently plays for Sol de América.

Career
Before signing for Racing Club, Bonet played for Paraguayan sides Sol de América, Libertad, Guaraní, Olimpia, Quilmes and Rangers . While playing in Paraguay he scored 6 goals in 133 games.

He is the brother of Paraguay national team regular Carlos Bonet. Bonet also plays as a right-side defender regularly.

External links
 Roberto Bonet at BDFA.com.ar 
 Roberto Bonet – Argentine Primera statistics at Fútbol XXI  
 

1980 births
Living people
Sportspeople from Asunción
Paraguayan footballers
Paraguayan expatriate footballers
Club Sol de América footballers
Club Libertad footballers
Club Guaraní players
Club Olimpia footballers
Racing Club de Avellaneda footballers
Argentine Primera División players
Expatriate footballers in Argentina
Expatriate footballers in Chile
Quilmes Atlético Club footballers
Rangers de Talca footballers
Association football wingers
Association football fullbacks